The Missouri and Kansas Interurban Railway was an interurban line running from Kansas City, Missouri through downtown Overland Park to Olathe in Kansas.

It ran from 1906 until July 9, 1940 and was the last of the interurban trolley lines in the Kansas City metropolitan area.

It was called the "Strang Line" for Johnson County developer William B. Strang Jr. The line used combination diesel and electric trolley cars, which were housed and maintained in the Strang Carbarn, at 79th Street and Santa Fe Drive, currently the home of Traditions Furniture in Downtown Overland Park.

See also
 List of interurbans

References

External links
 Kansas City Public Library history

Kansas City interurban railways
Transportation in Johnson County, Kansas
Transportation in Olathe, Kansas
Transportation in Wyandotte County, Kansas
Defunct Kansas railroads
Defunct Missouri railroads
Transportation in the Kansas City metropolitan area